Giorgi Jgenti is a Georgian professional rugby union player. He currently in France for Brive in the Top 14 competition.

References

External links
Ligue Nationale De Rugby Profile
European Professional Club Rugby Profile

Living people
1985 births
Rugby union players from Georgia (country)
Rugby union props